Tea Pedić (born 6 September 1996) is a Croatian footballer who plays as a defender and has appeared for the Croatia women's national team.

Career
Pedić has been capped for the Croatia national team, appearing for the team during the UEFA Women's Euro 2021 qualifying cycle.

References

External links
 
 
 

1996 births
Living people
Croatian women's footballers
Croatia women's international footballers
Women's association football defenders
Croatian Women's First Football League players
ŽNK Split players